Southern Railway "Maud" 1509 is the oldest surviving steam locomotive of the Southern Railway.  The engine was built by Baldwin in December 1879 for the Atlanta and Charlotte Air Line Railway, originally numbered 27 and named Talullah.  The railroad was later absorbed by the Richmond and Danville Railroad which itself became the Southern Railway, and thus, Talullah ultimately became Southern #1509.  

Very little is known about the engine's history prior to the 1903 renumbering and company records from that time are largely either missing, incomplete, and/or contain conflicting data.  The 1509 was likely used for passenger service, particularly with suburban or commuter runs, and when renumbered, it received the A class designation, being a switcher engine used in yard service.

Southern rebuilt the engine in 1903, and from then until retirement, it served as a switcher for the railway's Pegram Shops in Atlanta.  There, it was given the name, Maud by the shop employees.  Maud was retired June 29, 1950, and moved to Inman, Georgia, where it was to be scrapped.  However, the shop's workers had favored Maud, and wrote to then Southern Railway president E. E. Norris requesting the engine be preserved.  Norris obliged, and Maud was placed on display outside of the shops until 1960.  That year, the engine was donated to the Atlanta chapter of the National Railway Historical Society, who had placed it in their Southeastern Railway Museum in Duluth, Georgia.

Current status
As of November 2020, Southern Railway 1509 is stored, disassembled outside the Southeastern Railway Museum's shops, where it is awaiting restoration.

References

 The "Hot Box" as edited by George Weber, April 1961 & May 1990

External links
Southern Railway 1509 at Steam Locomotive.info
Locomotives Used on Southern Railway Steam Specials, NS Steam

Steam locomotives of Southern Railway (U.S.)
0-4-4T locomotives
Baldwin locomotives
Railway locomotives introduced in 1880
Forney locomotives
Individual locomotives of the United States
Standard gauge locomotives of the United States
Preserved steam locomotives of Georgia